The spotted wood owl (Strix seloputo) is an owl of the earless owl genus, Strix. Its range is disjunct; it occurs in many regions surrounding Borneo, but not on that island itself.

Description
The head is chocolate brown with an orangish-buff facial disc and, in the nominate subspecies, a yellowish throat band, but there are no ear-tufts. The upper parts are coffee-coloured, with white bars and spots edged with black. The underparts are dull yellow with broad white and narrow black bars. The eye is dark brown and the beak greenish-black. The legs and toes are well-feathered, with the visible parts being olive. The call is a rolling "huhuhu" followed by a long "whoo".

Distribution and habitat
There are three subspecies: Strix seloputo seloputo occurs in South Myanmar and central Thailand to Singapore as well as Jambi (Sumatra) and Java; Strix seloputo baweana is endemic to the island of Bawean off North Java; Strix seloputo wiepkini occurs in the  Calamian Islands and Palawan (Philippines). Typical habitats include lowland forest, mangrove swamps, cleared woodland, plantations, and parks in towns and villages.

Ecology
The diet of this owl consists mainly of mice and rats, supplemented by insects and small birds.

Status
The spotted wood owl has a very wide range, and is described as being common in some areas. The population size has not been quantified but it seems to be stable, and the International Union for Conservation of Nature has assessed the bird's conservation status as being of "least concern".

References

 Holt, Denver W., Berkley, Regan; Deppe, Caroline; Enríquez Rocha, Paula L.; Olsen, Penny D.; Petersen, Julie L.; Rangel Salazar, José Luis; Segars, Kelley P. & Wood, Kristin L. (1999): 94. Spotted Wood Owl. In: del Hoyo, J.; Elliott, A. & Sargatal, J. (eds): Handbook of Birds of the World, Volume 5: Barn-owls to Hummingbirds: 197, plate 12. Lynx Edicions, Barcelona. 
 König, Claus; Weick, Friedhelm & Becking, Jan-Hendrik (1999): Owls: A guide to the owls of the world. Yale University Press, New Haven. 
 Lewis, Deane P. (2005): OwlPages.com Owl Species ID: 130.010.000 - Spotted Wood Owl - Strix seloputo. Version of 2005-APR-21. Retrieved 2007-AUG-16.

External links
 

spotted wood owl
Birds of Southeast Asia
spotted wood owl
spotted wood owl